Cyprus entered the Eurovision Song Contest 1992 with "Teriazoume" by Evridiki, after she won the Cypriot national final.

National final
The Cypriot broadcaster, CyBC, held a national final to select the Cypriot entry for the Eurovision Song Contest 1992, held in Malmö, Sweden. The contest was held on 13 March at the International Conference Centre in Nicosia, hosted by Eirini Charalambidou. The winner selected from the eight songs that competed was chosen through the votes of a 24-person jury.

The winner was Evridiki with the song "Teriazoume", composed by George Theofanous and Leonidas Malenis.

At Eurovision
Evridiki performed 9th on the night of the contest, following Portugal and preceding Malta. "Teriazoume" received 57 points, placing 11th of 23 countries competing.

Voting

References

External links
Cypriot National Final 1992

1992
Countries in the Eurovision Song Contest 1992
Eurovision